"You'd Better Love Me" is song written by Hugh Martin and Timothy Gray for the 1964 musical High Spirits. "You'd Better Love Me" and the B-side "Home Sweet Heaven" were originally performed by Tammy Grimes.

Other recordings 
Petula Clark – B-side to "Downtown" (1964)
Jack McDuff – The Dynamic Jack McDuff (1964, instrumental)
Shirley Bassey – Shirley Bassey at the Pigalle (1965)
Sonny Stitt – Broadway Soul (1965, instrumental)
Nancy Wilson – From Broadway with Love (1966)
Mel Tormé – That's All (bonus track on 1997 reissue)
James Darren – This One's from the Heart (1999)
Shirley Horn – You're My Thrill (2001)

References 

1964 songs
Songs from musicals